Barsky is a mostly Jewish (and, more rarely, Ukrainian and Russian) surname. It is derived from the name of the town of Bar in Vinnytsia Oblast, Ukraine. The single masculine suffix -sky imparts the meaning "of Bar" or "from Bar". The feminine counterpart of this suffix is -skaya but this form is only used in Slavic-speaking countries. Polish version is "Barski" and "Barska" for femine for of the surname. Notable people include:

 Amie Barsky (born c. 1984), American reality television show contestant
 Brian A. Barsky, American Professor of Computer Science and Vision Science
 Bud Barsky (1891–1967), Ukrainian-born American film producer
 Edward K. Barsky (1885-1975), American surgeon and political activist
 Evangelyn Barsky (1894–1936), American lawyer
 Ivan Hryhorovych-Barskyi (1713-1785), Ukrainian architect
 Jack Barsky, alias of Albrecht Dittrich, former KGB spy turned IT specialist.
 Joseph Barsky (d. 1943), Russian Jewish architect
 Max Barsky (born 1991), American professional wrestler best known by his ring name David Starr
 Moshe Barsky (1895-1913), Zionist settler in Ottoman Palestine, murdered in a hate crime that made him a martyr in the burgeoning Zionist movement.
 Paul Barsky, American talk radio personality
 Rick Barsky, Canadian Green Party politician
 Robert Barsky, American university professor
 Sam Barsky, Knitting artist
 Tim Barsky, American musician
 Vladimir Barsky, Russian actor and filmmaker, most famous as one of the stars of Battleship Potemkin.

Russian-language surnames
Jewish surnames